The Platypleurini are a tribe of cicadas from the Afrotropical and Oriental regions There are at least 30 genera and 240 described species in Platypleurini.

List of genera
These 31 genera belong to the tribe Platypleurini:

 Afzeliada Boulard, 1973
 Albanycada Villet, 1989
 Attenuella Boulard, 1973
 Azanicada Villet, 1989
 Brevisiana Boulard, 1973
 Canualna Boulard, 1985
 Capcicada Villet, 1989
 Esada Boulard, 1973
 Hainanosemia Kato, 1927
 Hamza Distant, 1904
 Ioba Distant, 1904
 Kalabita Moulton, 1923
 Karscheliana Boulard, 1990
 Koma Distant, 1904
 Kongota Distant, 1904
 Muansa Distant, 1904
 Munza Distant, 1904
 Oxypleura Amyot & Audinet-Serville, 1843
 Platypleura Amyot & Audinet-Serville, 1843
 Pycna Amyot & Audinet-Serville, 1843
 Sadaka Distant, 1904
 Sechellalna Boulard, 2010
 Severiana Boulard, 1973
 Soudaniella Boulard, 1973
 Strumosella Boulard, 1973
 Strumoseura Villet, 1999
 Suisha Kato, 1928
 Tugelana Distant, 1912
 Ugada Distant, 1904
 Umjaba Distant, 1904
 Yanga Distant, 1904

References

 
Cicadinae
Hemiptera tribes